The 1947–48 season in Swedish football, starting August 1947 and ending July 1948:

Honours

Official titles

Competitions

Promotions, relegations and qualifications

Promotions

League transfers

Relegations

Domestic results

Allsvenskan 1947–48

Division 2 Nordöstra 1947–48

Division 2 Sydvästra 1947–48

Norrländska Mästerskapet 1948 
Final

Svenska Cupen 1947 
Final

National team results 

 Sweden: 

 Sweden: 

 Sweden: 

 Sweden: 

 Sweden: 

 Sweden:

National team players in season 1947/48

Notes

References 
Print

Online

 
Seasons in Swedish football